The Renaissance Youth Center is a Bronx-based nonprofit founded in 2001 with the mission "to empower at-risk inner city youth to fully maximize their potential as productive and responsible members of society, by offering dynamic, team-building education, music, and sports programs, while instilling the importance of building strong communities." Renaissance serves more than 3,000 youths per week at their headquarters and more than 30 public schools in New York City.

History

Founded in 2001 as Renaissance Education, Music & Sports (Renaissance-EMS), Renaissance Youth Center offers a variety of programs in education, music, sports, and civic engagement.

Renaissance was co-founded by Bervin Harris and Darren Quinlan to serve the Bronx's Morrisania neighborhood. Harris was a former recording artist with Orpheus/Capitol Records, while Quinlan was a former NCAA Division 1 college basketball player at St. Bonaventure University, and songwriter who won the 1992 Abe Olman Scholarship from the Songwriters Hall of Fame. Harris and Quinlan helped produce KRS-One's album Spiritual Minded.

Key Programs

Music On Wheels

Music On Wheels brings music teachers and curriculum to schools that no longer have music programs for more than 30 public schools in New York City. Renaissance holds an annual Music On Wheels Recital where hundreds of students from New York City gather to perform for family and friends.

Music With A Message Band

The Music With A Message Band is a 25-member performance group, aged 6–21, that write songs about social issues and perform throughout New York City. The band has performed at Good Morning America, Carnegie Hall, the Women in the World Summit at Lincoln Center, the Apollo Theater, the New School, and the City Parks Foundation. In 2016, they opened Mayor Bill de Blasio's 2016 State of the City address at the Lehman Center for the Performing Arts.

In 2018, the band performed with Robin Roberts on Good Morning America, and in 2019, they performed a cover of Lupita Nyong'o's "Sulwe's Song", with Lupita Nyong'o surprising the band by showing up in-person to the Renaissance Youth Center to sing the song with the band.

Renaissance Youth Council

In 2014, Renaissance's Youth Council spent eight hours painting Unity Park a pink salmon color, only to have the NYC Parks Department paint over their work because the youth group permit only allowed them to use a gray color. After media attention and months of discussions, Renaissance partnered with the Parks Department to repaint the park.

In 2016, the Youth Council turned its attention to a nearby slaughterhouse, gathering over 4,700 petition signatures and support from New York State Assembly member Michael Blake to force the clean up of animal carcasses, blood spills, and the foul odor, that lowered the quality of life in the neighborhood.

In 2018, Renaissance Youth Council launched Youth Connect: Journey 2 Unity Tour, a five-borough tour with examples of positive teenagers to inspire disconnected youth engage with peers in local programs. Hundreds of youth attended these summer events, including the finale in Mullaly Park, that drew support from New York City Parks Department Commissioner Mitchell Silver and New York City Council member Vanessa Gibson.

Recognition

In 2013, the Berklee College of Music included Renaissance in its Berklee City Music Network, grading the Renaissance Music Program at 94/100.
In 2016, Renaissance co-Founder Bervin Harris was honored by the New York City Police Foundation for his work as a community partner with the 42nd Precinct. 
In 2017, RiteAid awarded Mr. Harris its inaugural KIDCHAMP Award.
In 2017, Congressman Jose Serrano and New York State Senator Jose Serrano honored Mr. Harris with an award for Black History Month.

Official Websites

Renaissance Youth Center Website
Music With A Message Band Website
Renaissance Youth Council Website

References

Companies based in New York City
Companies based in the Bronx
Non-profit organizations based in the Bronx